Brenes is a city located in the province of Seville, Spain. According to the 2014 census (INE), the city has a population of 12,737 inhabitants. It covers an area of 22 km2 with a density of 598,46 inhabitants/km2. Their geo-coordinates are: 37º 33' N, 5º 52' O and it is 18 m above sea level. The provincial capital, Seville, is 22 km away.

The city is mainly connected by A-462 towards Carmona, and by A-8008 connecting San José de la Rinconada and Seville.

Geography

Brenes is close to the Guadalquivir river.

References

External links
Brenes - Sistema de Información Multiterritorial de Andalucía

Municipalities of the Province of Seville